Banbury Borough Police was the police force responsible for policing the borough of Banbury in Oxfordshire, England between 1836 and 1925.

The force was created as a result of the Municipal Corporations Act of 1835. By 1864 there were 3 police officers patrolling the streets whilst one remained in the police station. Several attempts were made to amalgamate Banbury Borough Police with neighbouring forces. A merger with Oxfordshire Constabulary following the Local Government Act of 1888 was prevented only by the extension of the borough boundaries. By 1914 the force consisted of a head constable, 4 sergeants and 11 constables.

The force finally amalgamated with Oxforshire Constabulary on 1 October 1925 with the 2 sergeants and 11 constables serving at that time becoming members of the county constabulary.

References

Defunct police forces of England
Constabulary